Retribution for the Dead is an EP by the American death metal band Autopsy. It was released in 1991 by Peaceville Records. It features two songs which were re-recorded for the Mental Funeral album - the title song is exclusive to this EP.

Track listing
 "Retribution for the Dead" – 3:55
 "Destined to Fester" – 4:30
 "In the Grip of Winter" – 4:07

References

Autopsy (band) albums
1991 EPs